In the Royal Navy, a Captain (D) or Captain Destroyers is a commander responsible for the administration of ships and other vessels of either a destroyer flotilla or squadron.

See also 
 Captain (D) afloat

References 

D